Kursi is a constituency of the Uttar Pradesh Legislative Assembly covering the city of Kursi in the Barabanki district of Uttar Pradesh, India.

Kursi is one of five assembly constituencies in the Barabanki Lok Sabha constituency. Since 2008, this assembly constituency is numbered 266 amongst 403 constituencies.

Election results

2022

2017
Bharatiya Janta Party candidate Sakendra Pratap Verma won the 2017 Uttar Pradesh Legislative Elections defeating Samajwadi Party candidate Fareed Mahfooz Kidwai by a margin of 28,679 votes.

References

External links
 

Assembly constituencies of Uttar Pradesh
Barabanki district